Igora is a year-round resort in the Leningrad Oblast, Russia. There's a multifunctional area for outdoor activities and spa complex. The resort is located on the 54th kilometer of the Priozersky highway, in the Priozersky District of Leningrad Oblast, in the immediate vicinity of the village of Sosnovo. It is named after local Lake Igora.

History 
The resort was opened on January 28, 2006, with Ozon LLC as its original owner.

Official competitions
The resort has international certification for parallel slalom competitions .

Extreme Park
In the winter season, the Igora ski resort built a park for skiers and snowboarders. Usually the park was divided into 3 zones: halfpipe zone, slopestyle zone with jumps and a jibbing zone with a variety of handrails and boxes. In the extreme park there were competitions for professionals and amateurs, such as: Igora Sun Pipe, Igora Rail Jam, and Igora Snow Sapiens.

Racing complex 
In 2019, the Igora Drive racing complex, designed by Herman Tilke, was opened in Igora along with Igora Rail Jam and Igora Snow Sapiens

References

External link
Igora - Official website
Igora webcams

Ski areas and resorts in Russia
Tourist attractions in Leningrad Oblast